Yolande Moreau (born 27 February 1953) is a Belgian comedian, actress, film director and screenwriter. She has won three César Awards from four nominations.

Career
She made her cinematic debut with director Agnès Varda in two movies: Sept pièces (1984) and Vagabond (1985). In 1989, she joined Jérôme Deschamps and Macha Makeieff's troupe, of which she became one of the stars, especially on the TV programme, Les Deschiens. She played La Levaque in Germinal (1993) directed by Claude Berri, a concierge in the film Amélie (2001) and Mama Chow in Micmacs (2009) (both directed by Jean-Pierre Jeunet), a mime in Paris, Je T'aime (2006) and a lovesick woman in Vagabond (1985) directed by Agnès Varda. She made her directorial debut with the movie When the Sea Rises, which she co-wrote and starred in. The movie was acclaimed by critics, and Yolande Moreau won two César Awards for Best Debut and Best Actress. Moreau stars in the French horror thriller film The Pack, which premiered at the 2010 Cannes Film Festival. Her 2013 film Henri was screened in the Directors' Fortnight section at the 2013 Cannes Film Festival.

Moreau was scheduled to be the guest of honour at the 2017 Brussels Film Festival, but this edition had to be cancelled after subsidies were withdrawn.

Personal life
At 18, she met an older man. Together they have two children, Héloïse and Nils, but they separated when Yolande was 21. Alone with her two children, she worked in various trades, including as a housekeeper. She is the grandmother of four grandchildren.

Awards and honours
Moreau has won three César Awards: one for Best First Film (in 2005) and two for Best Actress (in 2005 and 2009) and is the most awarded Belgian actress.

Theater

Filmography

Actress

Filmmaker

Box-office 

Movies starring Yolande Moreau with more than a million of entries in France.

References

External links

1953 births
Living people
Actresses from Brussels
Belgian film actresses
Belgian film directors
Belgian screenwriters
Belgian women screenwriters
Belgian women film directors
Best Actress César Award winners
Best Actress Lumières Award winners
Magritte Award winners